David Spielberg (March 6, 1939 – June 1, 2016) was an American television and film actor.

Early years
Spielberg was born in Weslaco, Texas, and was a resident of Mercedes, Texas. His father was a Romanian-Jewish immigrant, and his mother was a Mexican-American teacher. After serving in the Navy for two years, he enrolled in the University of Texas. Two summers' acting experience in New York City led him to drop out of the university and move to New York to pursue a career in acting. He was not related to American film director Steven Spielberg.

Film
Spielberg's screen debut was in The Effect of Gamma Rays on Man-in-the-Moon Marigolds (1972). He also appeared in Newman's Law (1974), Law and Disorder (1974), Hustle (1975), American Raspberry (1977), The Choirboys (1977), Real Life (1979), Winter Kills (1979), Christine (1983), The Stranger (1987), Alice (1990), and Red Ribbon Blues (1996).

Television
Spielberg's roles in television programs included those shown in the table below.

He also appeared in Wiseguy, The Rockford Files, Law & Order, Highway to Heaven, Family Ties, Wheels, L.A. Law, ER, A Place for Annie, Hart to Hart, One Day at a Time, and Star Trek: The Next Generation, among other television series.

Death
Spielberg died of cancer in Los Angeles, California, on June 1, 2016. He was 77.

Filmography

References

External links
 
 Obituary
 

1939 births
20th-century American male actors
2016 deaths
American male film actors
American male television actors
American people of Romanian-Jewish descent
American male actors of Mexican descent
Male actors from Texas
People from Weslaco, Texas
United States Navy sailors
Jewish American male actors
21st-century American Jews
Deaths from cancer in California